Paul Henry Marsh (30 October 1952 - 5 July 2009) was an English literary agent who was described by The Independent on Sunday as "one of the key players in this globalisation of literary culture".

Marsh was born in East London in 1952, one of two sons of Ricky Marsh, the foreign editor of The Daily Telegraph.

References

1952 births
2009 deaths
People from London
Literary agents